is a Japanese composer, guitarist, and video game designer. He is best known for his work on the Persona series of video games by Atlus, of which he served as the sound director for until leaving the company in 2021. His musical style spans several genres, including rock, electronic, jazz, classical, and J-pop. Meguro has also worked on games in non-musical roles, such as serving as the creative director for the PSP remakes of Persona and Persona 2, and creating indie games.

Career

Early life
Meguro was born in Tokyo, Japan, on June 4, 1971. He became familiar with technology from a young age due to his parents running a factory. As a child, Meguro did not take an interest in popular music, and instead listened to and enjoyed classical. In junior high, he became interested in the likes of jazz artists such as T-Square, Herb Alpert, and Casiopea. It was in junior high that he became particularly fond of writing and profiteering music. He then majored in hydrodynamics at the College of Industrial Technology at Nihon University.

Atlus
After sending a demo tape and attending two interviews, Meguro was hired by Atlus in 1995. He got his start in the company by working on Revelations: Persona for the PlayStation, for which he composed 16 tracks, including one that became a staple in the series: "Aria of the Soul". Meguro continued to work on several projects in the mid to late 1990s, including Devil Summoner: Soul Hackers on the Sega Saturn, composing around 50 pieces for the game, as well as Maken X on the Dreamcast.

The first time he became a leading composer was on Shin Megami Tensei: Nocturne in 2003, where he somewhat diverged from the music in the prior games for the Megami Tensei series, giving the game a more orchestral and fusion sound. A crucial point of his career was Digital Devil Saga; he had creative freedom that let him establish his own sound. Meguro also worked on series such as Trauma Center in the mid 2000s.

Meguro's career was propelled to international stardom in his craft with his work on Persona 3, where he used a pop-based vocal style, and the soundtrack to the game sold over 100,000 copies. In 2008, Meguro continued upon his success with Persona 4, where he blended genres to craft a unique sound. A concert at Akasaka Blitz was held to celebrate Meguro's work on the Persona series, where Persona favorites were played. During this time, he also worked on the music on Devil Summoner 2: Raidou Kuzunoha vs. King Abaddon.

Meguro was promoted to game director for the PlayStation Portable remake of Persona. During this time he received some criticism from some fans for changing the soundtrack for the remake, but overall received a warm response. He later directed the PSP ports of both Persona 2: Innocent Sin and Eternal Punishment. In the mid-2010s, Meguro served as the sound director for three spin-off Persona titles, as well as composing and producing the majority of the soundtrack for Persona 5. Meguro also contributed to the upcoming Project Re Fantasy game, the film Mint, and Persona 5 Royal. He also served as the lead composer for Persona 5: The Animation, arranging various tracks from the original game in addition to writing new material.

Meguro announced his departure from Atlus in October 2021, choosing to become a freelancer while still being contracted to work on some Atlus projects. His first announced project after leaving was Guns Undarkness, an indie game which he designed and composed music for. He later launched a Kickstarter campaign to help crowdfund the game, with it expected to be released on PC and consoles.

Musical style and influences
Although many of his works feature a signature rock style, Meguro experiments with different musical genres, such as orchestral, electronica, jazz, and hip hop on various projects. Meguro cites video game composers Koichi Sugiyama, Hiroshi Kawaguchi, and Takenobu Mitsuyoshi, as well as T-Square, Casiopea, Beethoven, and Tchaikovsky as some of his musical influences. Regarding the use of English lyrics in many of the Persona games, Meguro stated that due to Japanese people not fully understanding the language, it helped create music that was not as distracting to them as Japanese would be.

Works
All works listed below were composed by Meguro unless otherwise noted.

References

1971 births
Japanese electronic musicians
Japanese jazz guitarists
Japanese male composers
Male guitarists
Japanese rock guitarists
Japanese video game designers
Japanese video game directors
Living people
Musicians from Tokyo
Nihon University alumni
Persona (series)
Video game composers
21st-century guitarists
21st-century Japanese composers
21st-century Japanese male musicians
20th-century guitarists
20th-century Japanese composers
20th-century Japanese male musicians
Male jazz musicians
Freelance musicians